The 1992 Cricket World Cup (officially the Benson & Hedges World Cup 1992) was the fifth staging of the Cricket World Cup, organised by the International Cricket Council (ICC). It was held in Australia and New Zealand from 22 February to 25 March 1992, and finished with Pakistan beating England by 22 runs in the final to become the World Cup champions for the first time. The 1992 World Cup is remembered for the controversial "rain rule". South Africa tried to take advantage of this rule by slowing down their semi-final against England, but the tactic ultimately cost them the match.

Firsts
The 1992 World Cup was the first to feature coloured player clothing, white cricket balls and black sight screens, with a number of matches being played under floodlights. It was also the first Cricket World Cup to be held in the Southern Hemisphere, and the first to include South Africa, who had been allowed to re-join the International Cricket Council as a Test-playing nation after the end of apartheid. For the first time, the World Cup was not held after a four-year gap, but five.

Format

The format was changed from previous tournaments, with a complete round-robin replacing the former two qualifying groups. The initial draw was released with eight competing countries and 28 round-robin matches, plus two semi-finals and a final. In late 1991, South Africa were re-admitted to the International Cricket Council after 21 years of exclusion due to apartheid, and the draw was amended to include them, adding another eight matches to the round-robin.

The rule for calculating the target score for the team batting second in rain-affected matches was also changed. The previous rule (the Average Run Rate method) simply multiplied the run rate of the team batting first by the number of overs available to the team batting second, but this rule had been deemed to give an unfair advantage to the team batting second.

In an attempt to rectify this, the target score would now be calculated by the Most Productive Overs method. In this system, if the team batting second had 44 overs available, their target score would be one greater than the 44 highest scoring overs of the team batting first.

While the reasoning behind the system seemed plausible, the timing of rain interruptions remained problematic: as the semi-final between England and South Africa demonstrated, where a difficult but eminently reachable 22 runs off 13 balls was reduced to 22 runs off 7 (the least productive over, a maiden, being deducted) and finally, a preposterous 21 off 1 ball (the next least productive over having given 1 run). It was seen that, if the interruption came during the second innings, the side batting second was at a significant disadvantage – one which was only overcome once, in fact, in England's group-stage victory over South Africa. The farcical end to the semi-final led to the creation of the Duckworth-Lewis method.

Teams

The 1992 World Cup featured the seven Test teams at that time.

For the first time, South Africa competed as the eighth full member of the ICC, and would play their first Test in 22 years in the West Indies a month after the World Cup. Zimbabwe appeared for the third time, having qualified by winning the 1990 ICC Trophy defeating the Netherlands in the final for the second time. Zimbabwe would gain full member status following the tournament and play their first Test match later in 1992. Teams who entered were:

Venues

Australia

New Zealand

Officials

Umpires

Eleven umpires were selected to officiate at the World Cup: two from each of the host nations, Australia and New Zealand, and one from each of the other participating nations.

West Indies' Steve Bucknor and England's David Shepherd were chosen as the umpires for the first semi-final, while New Zealand's Brian Aldridge and Australia's Steve Randell were chosen for the second. Bucknor and Aldridge were chosen for the final.

Referees

Two match referees were also selected to supervise the semi-finals and final. Australia's Peter Burge supervised the first semi-final and the final, while New Zealand's Frank Cameron supervised the second semi-final.

Squads

Round-robin stage

Co-hosts New Zealand proved the surprise package of the tournament, winning their first seven consecutive games to finish on top of the table after the round-robin. The other hosts, Australia, one of the pre-tournament favourites lost their first two matches. They recovered somewhat to win four of the remaining six, but narrowly missed out on the semi-finals. The West Indies also finished with a 4–4 record, but were just behind Australia on run-rate. South Africa made a triumphant return to international cricket with a win over Australia at the Sydney Cricket Ground in their first match. They and England had solid campaigns and easily qualified for the semis, despite upset losses to Sri Lanka and Zimbabwe  respectively. India had a disappointing tournament and never looked likely to progress beyond the round-robin. Sri Lanka were still establishing themselves at the highest level and beat only Zimbabwe (who did not yet have Test status) and South Africa.

New Zealand were defeated only twice in the tournament, both times by Pakistan in consecutive matches, in their final group match and in the semi-final.

Points table

Tournament progression

Results

Knockout stage

Summary

In the first semi-final, Pakistan defeated tournament favourites New Zealand in a high-scoring match to win their first semi-final in four attempts and book a place in the World Cup Final for the first time. New Zealand batted first and scored 262. Their captain Martin Crowe was injured while scoring 91, and opted to let John Wright captain during Pakistan's innings rather than risk aggravating the injury, which was seen as a mistake in hindsight. When Inzamam-ul-Haq came in to bat, Pakistan still needed 123 from 15 overs. He smashed 60 runs in 37 balls in the chase to achieve the target with one over remaining and also won the Man of the Match award.

In the second semi-final between South Africa and England, the match ended in controversial circumstances when, after a 10-minute rain delay, the most productive overs method revised South Africa's target from 22 runs from 13 balls to an impossible 22 runs from one ball. This rule was replaced for One Day International matches in Australia after the World Cup as a result of this incident, and it was eventually superseded by the Duckworth–Lewis method for the 1999 World Cup onwards. According to the late Bill Frindall, had the Duckworth–Lewis method been applied at that rain interruption, the revised target would have been four runs to tie or five to win from the final ball. The Duckworth-Lewis method would also have changed the target earlier in the day, due to earlier rain interruptions.

Bracket

Semi-finals

Final

In a thrilling final, Pakistan beat England by 22 runs at the Melbourne Cricket Ground (MCG). Derek Pringle took two early wickets for England before Imran Khan and Javed Miandad added 139 for the third wicket to steady the Pakistan innings – although both were very slow to score early on, and Imran benefited from a dropped catch just as he was trying to increase the tempo, having up to that point scored only 9 in 16 overs. He went on to score 72. At the 25 over mark, Pakistan had only scored 70, but accelerated the score to 139 by the 31st over as Javed Miandad summoned a runner, and he and Imran Khan built a steady partnership. During his innings, Imran hit a huge six off Richard Illingworth that landed far back into the members section. Imran played a captain's innings, getting a score of 72 and Miandad 58 to steady the innings, expectedly followed by an onslaught from Inzamam (42) and Wasim Akram (33) enabling Pakistan to give England a fighting target of 250.

England's start was shaky. Ian Botham was dismissed for a duck by Wasim Akram, followed by Alec Stewart, Hick and Gooch, which left England tumbling at 69/4. A solid partnership of 71 between Allan Lamb and Neil Fairbrother caused Imran to give an early second spell to his main pacer Wasim Akram in the 35th over. The decision wrote the fate of the match. Two deliveries from the left arm fast bowler dismissed Allan Lamb and Chris Lewis. Soon Fairbrother was caught by Moin Khan off Aaqib Javed to seal England's fate. Imran Khan had the final say, when he had Richard Illingworth caught by Ramiz Raja off his bowling to finish the final and crown Pakistan World Champions.

Statistics

Man of the Series

Martin Crowe, New Zealand

Tactical innovations
A notable feature of this World Cup was the innovative tactics employed by New Zealand captain Martin Crowe, who opened his team's bowling with spin bowler Dipak Patel, rather than with a fast bowler, as is usual practice. Another innovation was the then-unorthodox ploy of opening the batting with "pinch hitters", such as New Zealand's Mark Greatbatch. These innovations reversed the immediate prior form of New Zealand who had lost 3–0 in their most recent series against England, with one commentator writing, "Without a host of world-class performers, New Zealand got crafty instead".

Notes and references

 Wisden Almanack Report
 List A Limited Overs Matches played in Australia Season 1992/93
 Imran's Tigers turn the corner

External links

Cricket World Cup 1992 from Cricinfo

 
1992 in Australian cricket
1992 in New Zealand cricket
1992
International cricket competitions from 1991–92 to 1994
International cricket competitions in Australia
International cricket competitions in New Zealand
February 1992 sports events in Oceania
March 1992 sports events in Oceania
February 1992 sports events in Australia
March 1992 sports events in Australia
February 1992 sports events in New Zealand
March 1992 sports events in New Zealand